Meringa is a genus of Polynesian araneomorph spiders in the family Physoglenidae that was first described by Raymond Robert Forster in 1990. Originally placed with the Synotaxidae, it was moved to the Physoglenidae in 2017.

Species
 it contains nine species, found on New Zealand:
Meringa australis Forster, 1990 – New Zealand
Meringa borealis Forster, 1990 – New Zealand
Meringa centralis Forster, 1990 – New Zealand
Meringa conway Forster, 1990 – New Zealand
Meringa hinaka Forster, 1990 – New Zealand
Meringa leith Forster, 1990 – New Zealand
Meringa nelson Forster, 1990 – New Zealand
Meringa otago Forster, 1990 (type) – New Zealand
Meringa tetragyna Forster, 1990 – New Zealand

See also
 List of Physoglenidae species

References

Araneomorphae genera
Physoglenidae
Spiders of New Zealand
Taxa named by Raymond Robert Forster